Acalolepta longiscapus is a species of beetle in the family Cerambycidae. It was described by Charles Joseph Gahan in 1894. It is known from Malaysia, Laos, Myanmar and India.

References

Acalolepta
Beetles described in 1894